Qinglung  (Qinglong-xiang )  is a township in Baingoin County,  Tibet Autonomous Region, People's Republic of China.

See also
List of towns and villages in Tibet

Populated places in Nagqu
Township-level divisions of Tibet